Eddie Manso Fuentes is a Puerto Rican politician and the former mayor of Loíza. Manso is affiliated with the New Progressive Party (PNP) and he served as mayor from 2005 to 2017. Has a degree in Business Administration and Management from Universidad del Este.

References

Living people
Mayors of places in Puerto Rico
New Progressive Party (Puerto Rico) politicians
People from Loíza, Puerto Rico
Year of birth missing (living people)